Visak is a hill in the municipality of Rača (Serbian Cyrillic: Рача) located in the Šumadija District of Serbia. Top of the hill is 396 meters above sea level and is on the road Smederevska Palanka-Rača-Kragujevac 44°10'27.14"N  20°55'10.98"E.

Hills of Serbia